The Huff House and Farmstead is a historic  property located on River Road at the South Branch Raritan River near the Flagtown section of Hillsborough Township in Somerset County, New Jersey, United States. The Huff House was built in 1842 and was added to the National Register of Historic Places on November 7, 1976, for its significance in agriculture and politics/government.

See also
 National Register of Historic Places listings in Somerset County, New Jersey

References

Hillsborough Township, New Jersey	
Houses in Somerset County, New Jersey
Farmhouses in the United States
National Register of Historic Places in Somerset County, New Jersey
Houses completed in 1842
1842 establishments in New Jersey
New Jersey Register of Historic Places